Adrianus Josephus Elisabeth Havermans (25 August 1934 – 8 March 2022) was a Dutch politician. A member of the Catholic People's Party and later the Christian Democratic Appeal, he served as Mayor of The Hague from 1985 to 1996. He died in The Hague on 8 March 2022, at the age of 87.

References

1934 births
2022 deaths
Catholic People's Party politicians
Christian Democratic Appeal politicians
Mayors of The Hague